COPE is a 2007 psychological thriller/horror independent film written and directed by Ronald Jerry and produced by Kitty Productions, a multimedia company based in Kodiak, Alaska.

Plot
The film is a psychological suspense drama that centers on one family from Kodiak, Alaska. The town’s citizens disappear during the night mysteriously. Mickey Allen is alive to find out what happened to them. Another single survivor offers mysterious clues. Meanwhile, his sister Lauren is trapped in a pure white cell and is forced to do her own searching of the past.

Cast
Rachel Pinto
Robert Allen Wagner
Krystal Sullivan
David Weinand
Stacey Becklund
Orion Crockett
Ry Pengilly
Tammi Solorio
Amy Steinbach
Pat Maloney
Thomas Kinsley
Patrick Keegan
Dakota Nelson
Anita Steinbach

Reception
Ben Platt of Something Awful panned the film while simultaneously panning the distributor, noting that "they were only able to force this film on the public with a hearty dose of lies."  Similarly, Wild Realm Reviews called it amateurish and incoherent nonsense, noting "Labeled as a 'psychological thriller,' there's nothing of the psychological or the thrilling about it. It's merely a photographed mess devoid of characterization or plot."
The film was also referred to as a “hellish mess with no understandable plot in sight” and was also described as “a movie that has a plot, but doesn’t invest people enough to the point of where they would care, a gigantic pile of sh*t”

References

External links
Cope at the Internet Movie Database
Cope at All Movie Guide
Kitty Productions official website

2007 films
2007 horror films
American psychological horror films
2000s English-language films
2000s American films